Homespun, also known as the Bell House, is a historic home located near Winchester, Frederick County, Virginia. It is a vernacular, -story log, frame, stone and brick structure dating from the late 18th and early 19th centuries. The earliest section was built in the 1790s, and is a three-bay wooden structure consisting of two log pens with a frame connector, or dogtrot, and covered with weatherboards.  A two-story, two-bay, stone and brick addition was built about 1820. Also on the property is a contributing stone smokehouse.

It was listed on the National Register of Historic Places in 2002.

References

External links
 

Houses on the National Register of Historic Places in Virginia
Houses completed in 1795
Houses in Frederick County, Virginia
National Register of Historic Places in Frederick County, Virginia